Oktay Delibalta (born 27 October 1985 in Samsun, Turkey) is a Turkish footballer who plays as a midfielder, most recently for Fethiyespor.

External links

Oktay Delibalta at Soccerway

1985 births
Living people
Sportspeople from Samsun
Turkish footballers
Süper Lig players
Samsunspor footballers
Gençlerbirliği S.K. footballers
Gaziantepspor footballers
Association football midfielders